Denis Maksymilian Kudla (born 24 December 1994) is a German Greco-Roman wrestler. He won a bronze medal at the 2016 European Wrestling Championships. Kudla won a bronze medal at the 2016 Summer Olympics at 85 kg. He lost to eventual winner Davit Chakvetadze of Russia.

References

External links 
 
 
 
 

1994 births
Living people
People from Racibórz
German male sport wrestlers
Olympic wrestlers of Germany
Olympic bronze medalists for Germany
Olympic medalists in wrestling
Wrestlers at the 2016 Summer Olympics
Medalists at the 2016 Summer Olympics
World Wrestling Championships medalists
European Wrestling Championships medalists
Wrestlers at the 2020 Summer Olympics
Medalists at the 2020 Summer Olympics
21st-century German people